Angelomus (died c.895) was a monk from Luxeuil, Franche-Comté, and Biblical commentator. He was influenced by Alcuin. He used the Pseudo-Jerome.

Works
Commentarius in Genesin (online)
Enarrationes In Libros Regum (online, 1565 edition online)
Enarrationes In Cantica Canticorum (online)

References
Michael Gorman, The Commentary on Genesis of Angelomus of Luxeuil and Biblical Studies under Lothar, Studi medievali 40 (1999)
Robert G. Babcock, Angelomus and Manuscripts from the Luxeuil Library, Aevum, LXXIV (May–August 2000), 431-440

Notes

External links

890s deaths
Year of birth unknown
French biblical scholars
Roman Catholic biblical scholars
9th-century French writers
9th-century Christian clergy
Writers from the Carolingian Empire
9th-century Latin writers
Colombanian saints